Sarvārthasiddhi is a famous Jain text authored by Ācārya Pujyapada. It is the oldest extant commentary on Ācārya Umaswami's Tattvārthasūtra (another famous Jain text). Traditionally though, the oldest commentary on the Tattvārthasūtra is the Gandhahastimahābhāṣya. A commentary is a word-by-word or line-by-line explication of a text.

Author 
Ācārya Pujyapada, the author of Sarvārthasiddhi was a famous Digambara monk. Pujyapada was a poet, grammarian, philosopher and a profound scholar of Ayurveda.

Content 
The author begins with an explanation of the invocation of the Tattvārthasūtra. The ten chapters of Sarvārthasiddhi are:

Faith and Knowledge
The Category of the Living
The Lower World and the Middle World
The Celestial Beings
The Category of the Non-Living
Influx of Karma
The Five Vows
Bondage of Karma
Stoppage and Shedding of Karma
Liberation

In the text, Dāna (charity) is defined as the act of giving one's wealth to another for mutual benefit.

English translation 

Prof. S. A. Jain translated the Sarvārthasiddhi in English language. In the preface to his book, he wrote:

References

Citations

Sources
 Alt URL

External links 
 Tattvartha Sutra with Sarvarthasiddhi English translation by Vijay K. Jain, 2018 (includes glossary)

Jain texts